Pyrgocythara subdiaphana is a species of sea snail, a marine gastropod mollusk in the family Mangeliidae.

Description
The length of the shell attains 5 mm.

Distribution
This marine species was found off Cabo San Lucas, Baja California, Mexico

References

Further reading
 

subdiaphana
Gastropods described in 1864
Taxa named by Philip Pearsall Carpenter